Plas-y-Court Halt railway station was a  railway station  to the west of Wollaston, Shropshire, England. The station opened in 1934 and closed in 1960. The halt was situated to the east side of a gated  level crossing  and on the south side of the line opposite the crossing keeper's cottage. It was made of timber and had a waiting shelter. The halt has been demolished but the crossing keeper's cottage remains as a private residence.

References

Notes

Sources

Further reading

Disused railway stations in Shropshire
Railway stations in Great Britain opened in 1934
Railway stations in Great Britain closed in 1960
Former Great Western Railway stations
Former London, Midland and Scottish Railway stations